Dick Van Dyke, is an American entertainer, actor, singer, dancer, comedian, author, and activist. His career has spanned seven decades in theatre, live performance, recordings, television, and film.

He is a recipient of the Screen Actors Guild (SAG) Lifetime Achievement Award, an inductee into the Television Hall of Fame and has been instituted into the  Disney Legends Hall of Fame

Major awards

Grammy Awards

Tony Awards

Primetime Emmy Awards

Daytime Emmy Awards

Industry awards

Golden Globe Awards

Screen Actors Guild Award

Honours

Britannia Awards

Kennedy Center Honors

Miscellaneous awards

American Comedy Awards

People's Choice Awards

Television Critics Association

External links

 
 
 
 
 Dick Van Dyke – Disney Legends profile (requires Flash)
 Dick Van Dyke talks about his career for the Archive of American Television Arts and Sciences (requires Flash)
 Empire – The Worst British Accents Ever – Number 11 – Dick Van Dyke singing in Mary Poppins (1964) (requires Flash)

References 

Lists of awards received by American actor